Clayton Lake is a small recreational lake in Pushmataha County, Oklahoma.

The lake, which was built in 1935, impounds the waters of Peal Creek.  It is operated as Clayton Lake State Park by the State of Oklahoma.  The state park offers rental cabins, tent and RV campsites, picnic tables and shelters, comfort stations with showers, boat ramps, ADA accessible fishing dock, playground, hiking trails and swim beach.  It is a popular fishing and camping spot due to its scenic location nestled among the Kiamichi Mountains, surrounded by pine tree forests.

See also
List of lakes of Oklahoma

References

External links
 Clayton Lake State Park information, photos and video on TravelOK.com Official travel and tourism website for the State of Oklahoma

Lakes of Oklahoma
Lakes of Pushmataha County, Oklahoma